Michael Watson (born 14 January 1938) is a former Hong Kong cyclist. He competed in the team time trial at the 1964 Summer Olympics.

References

1938 births
Living people
Hong Kong male cyclists
Olympic cyclists of Hong Kong
Place of birth missing (living people)
Cyclists at the 1964 Summer Olympics